Ziezi Peak ia s rocky peak rising to 320 m in the southeast extremity of Breznik Heights on Greenwich Island  in the South Shetland Islands, Antarctica overlooking Targovishte Glacier to the west.

The feature is named after Ziezi, the mythical grandson of Noah, from whom the Bulgars descended, according to the 354 AD Roman Chronograph of Ravenna.

Location
Bulgarian topographic survey Tangra 2004/05 and mapping in 2009.

Maps
 L.L. Ivanov et al. Antarctica: Livingston Island and Greenwich Island, South Shetland Islands. Scale 1:100000 topographic map. Sofia: Antarctic Place-names Commission of Bulgaria, 2005.
 L.L. Ivanov. Antarctica: Livingston Island and Greenwich, Robert, Snow and Smith Islands. Scale 1:120000 topographic map.  Troyan: Manfred Wörner Foundation, 2009.

References
 Ziezi Peak. SCAR Composite Gazetteer of Antarctica
 Bulgarian Antarctic Gazetteer. Antarctic Place-names Commission. (details in Bulgarian, basic data in English)

External links
 Ziezi Peak. Copernix satellite image

Mountains of Greenwich Island
Bulgaria and the Antarctic